Sue Henry (Jan 19, 1940 - Nov 20, 2020) was a writer of mystery thriller fiction. She was also a librarian, college administrator, instructor at the University of Alaska.

Biography
According to her obituary in the Anchorage Daily News, she was born Mathilda Sue Hall in Salmon, Idaho, married Paul K. Henry in 1965; they had two boys, Bruce and Eric. After they divorced, she moved the boys to Fairbanks, Alaska in 1975.

Her first book Murder on the Iditarod Trail (1991), was well reviewed and won both the Macavity Awards and Anthony Awards for best first novel, prompting the author to develop a series based on this book's characters, Alaskan state trooper Alex Jensen and Jessie Arnold, a sled dog racer.

In 2005, she started a new mystery series featuring a 63-year-old widow, Maxine McNab, travelling in her Winnebago with a miniature dachshund, Stretch. Maxine had appeared in Dead North (2001) in the first series. Henry went on the road to research the book.

Murder on the Iditarod Trail was filmed for television as The Cold Heart of a Killer (1996) starring Kate Jackson, who bought the rights to the book.

All maps for her books starting with Dead North (2001) were made by her son, Eric Henry.

Publications

Alex Jensen and Jessie Arnold series
Murder on the Iditarod Trail (1991) Winner of the Macavity Award and Anthony Awards Awards for Best First Novel, 1992
Termination Dust (1996)
Sleeping Lady (1996)
Death Takes Passage (1997)
Deadfall (1998)
Murder on the Yukon Quest: An Alaska Mystery (1999)
Beneath the Ashes (2001)
Dead North (2001)
Cold Company  (2002)
Death Trap (2003)
Murder at Five Finger Light (2005)
Degrees of Separation (2008)
Cold as Ice (2010)

Maxie and Stretch series
The Serpents Trail (2004)
The Tooth of Time (2006)
The Refuge (2007)
The End of the Road (2009)

References

1940 births
Living people
20th-century American novelists
20th-century American women writers
21st-century American novelists
21st-century American women writers
American mystery writers
American women novelists
University of Alaska Anchorage faculty
Women mystery writers
Writers from Anchorage, Alaska
Anthony Award winners
American women academics